Masuk High School is a public high school in Monroe, Connecticut, United States, and includes grades 9 through 12. It is located on Connecticut Route 111 (Monroe Turnpike) in Monroe, between Old Coach Road and Pond View Road. The school has an indoor swimming pool and various successful clubs & sports.

History
Since its founding in 1958 from 32 acres of land donated by Semyon Masuk,

In 1973, officials at the school allowed students to refuse to pledge allegiance to the American flag. The Connecticut Veterans of Foreign Wars objected to this decision.

Renovations were conducted in 1977 and 2004, the latter adding an additional wing.

In 2005, the gymnasium was renamed "David Strong Gymnasium." On May 9th 2017, the track surrounding the newly constructed turf field was dedicated as the Edmund Butler Track.

Since 2011, the addition has housed the Jockey Hollow STEM Academy for students grades 6 through 8.

In 2015, the U.S. Department of Education named Masuk a National Blue Ribbon School.

Notable alumni

 Mike Gminski, Class of 1976, played basketball for Duke University, was selected in the first round of the 1980 NBA draft by the New Jersey Nets, played in the NBA for 14 years with the Nets, 76ers, Hornets and Bucks
Jesse Schwartz, voiced Leo in Little Einsteins

References

External links
 

Monroe, Connecticut
Schools in Fairfield County, Connecticut
Public high schools in Connecticut
1958 establishments in Connecticut
Educational institutions established in 1958
Buildings and structures in Monroe, Connecticut